Soham Chakrabarty is a playback singer who has sung many songs for Bollywood movies as well as for Bengali movies. He was declared the winner of Zee's "Sa-re-ga-ma"(A musical competition) in the year 2000 (at the age of 20). Till now his big hit is "In Dino" song from the movie Life in A... Metro and "Khudaya Khair" from the movie Billu Barber.

Early life

Soham is a Bengali, who started singing at the age of ten. He is trained in Hindustani classical music under the guidance of Pandit Jayendra Ghosh, Ustad Mohammed Sagaruddin Khan saab and Sukhdev Sengupta. Music directors Bappi Lahiri and O P Nayyar suggested to him that if he wanted to pursue singing as a career, he'd have to shift base to Mumbai. Since then he started living in Mumbai. He came to Mumbai in 2002.

Career

He has been through a lot of struggle. He sang for Ada and Dil Samander (Garam Masala) ads though that was finally dubbed by Sonu Nigam and KK, respectively. 
He has done several ad jingles like Emami and Mc Donalds with music director Pritam.
T-Series gave him his first break in 13 languages including Telugu, Tamil, Bhojpuri and Assamese. He has sung many Hindi and Bengali songs for Bollywood movies and Bengali movies, respectively. He has also sung devotional songs with popular singers like Debashish, Preeti, Pinky, Javed Ali, Charanjeet Singh Sondhi, Kalpana, Priya Bhattacharya, etc.

Filmography

Hindi Songs

 Reference:

2006

2007

2009

2010

2012

Bengali songs
 Reference:

2002

2006

2007

2008

2009

2010

2011

Accolades

References

External links

Living people
Bengali singers
Bengali Hindus
Bollywood playback singers
Indian male playback singers
Singers from Kolkata
Sa Re Ga Ma Pa participants
Year of birth missing (living people)
Screen Awards winners